Take Heart is the fifth studio album and second solo album by Juice Newton, released on September 17, 1979 by Capitol Records. Five singles were issued from Take Heart: "Any Way That You Want Me", "Lay Back in the Arms of Someone", "Until Tonight", "Sunshine", and "You Fill My Life". All the singles charted, but the album's fourth single, "Sunshine," was the biggest commercial success, peaking at No. 35 on the Hot Country Songs chart.

The album was released on CD for the first time on May 7, 2012 by BGO Records.

Track listing

Chart listings
The following songs charted on the Billboard Country Singles chart:
"Any Way That You Want Me" - #81
"Lay Back in the Arms of Someone" - #80
"Until Tonight" - #42
"Sunshine" - #35
"You Fill My Life" - #41

References

External links

Juice Newton albums
1979 albums
Capitol Records albums